Nationalist Task Party or Nationalist Labour Party was founded on 30 November 1985, when the Conservative Party changed its name. Its first president is Ali Koç. This party sought the votes of Nationalist Movement Party after 1980. Former MSP member Abdülkerim Doğru became president on 19 April 1987. Alparslan Türkeş became party president on 4 October 1987 with the lifting of the political ban on former politicians. Party won %2,9 vote on 29 November 1987 general elections, and they won 3 municipalities (Elazığ, Erzincan, Yozgat) in 1989 local elections.

1991 general elections
They made an alliance titled "Holy Alliance" with Welfare Party and Reformist Democracy Party on 20 October 1991 general elections. However, in 1991, according to election rules, no more than two parties could form an alliance. So MÇP's and IDP's deputy candidates attended with Welfare Party lists. This alliance won %16,9 vote and sent 62 MPs to the Turkish Grand National Assembly (which had a total of 550 seats).

Dissolution of The Party
Delegates decided to dissolve the party on 27 December 1992 and party dissolved on 24 January 1993. All members went to the newly opened (second time opened) Nationalist Movement Party.

References

Defunct nationalist parties in Turkey
Idealism (Turkey)